Pablo Andrés (Castilla y Leon) is a Spanish sprint canoer who has competed since the late 2000s. He won a gold medal in the K-1 4 x 200 m event at the 2010 ICF Canoe Sprint World Championships in Poznań.

References

 Canoe09.ca profile

Living people
Spanish male canoeists
Year of birth missing (living people)
ICF Canoe Sprint World Championships medalists in kayak
21st-century Spanish people